Most of the transport system in Ireland is in public hands, either side of the Irish border. The Irish road network has evolved separately in the two jurisdictions into which Ireland is divided, while the Irish rail network was mostly created prior to the partition of Ireland.

In the Republic of Ireland, the Minister for Transport, acting through the Department of Transport, is responsible for the state's road network, rail network, public transport, airports and several other areas. Although some sections of road have been built using private or public-private funds, and are operated as toll roads, they are owned by the Government of Ireland. The rail network is also state-owned and operated, while the government currently still owns the main airports. Public transport is mainly in the hands of a statutory corporation, Córas Iompair Éireann (CIÉ), and its subsidiaries, Bus Átha Cliath (Dublin Bus), Bus Éireann (Irish Bus), and Iarnród Éireann (Irish Rail).

On 1 November 2005, the Irish government published the Transport 21 plan which includes €18bn for improved roads and €16bn for improved rail, including the Western Railway Corridor and the Dublin Metro.

The Republic of Ireland's transport sector is responsible for 21% of the state's greenhouse gas emissions.

In Northern Ireland, the road network and railways are in state ownership. The Department for Infrastructure is responsible for these and other areas (such as water services). Two of the three main airports in Northern Ireland are privately operated and owned. The exception is City of Derry Airport, which is owned and funded by Derry City Council. A statutory corporation, the Northern Ireland Transport Holding Company (which trades as Translink) operates public transport services through its three subsidiaries – NI Railways Company Limited, Ulsterbus Limited, and Citybus Limited (now branded as Metro).

Railways

Total                                             
 broad gauge
 (1998);  electrified;  double track; some additions and removals since 1997

  standard gauge
 (2004) (Luas tramway);  electrified;  double track; additional track under construction

 narrow gauge
 (2006) (industrial railway operated by Bord na Móna)

Ireland's railways are in State ownership, with Iarnród Éireann (Irish Rail) operating services in the Republic and NI Railways operating services in Northern Ireland. The two companies co-operate in providing the joint Enterprise service between Dublin and Belfast. InterCity services are provided between Dublin and the major towns and cities of the Republic, and in Ulster along the Belfast–Derry railway line. Suburban railway networks operate in Dublin, Dublin Suburban Rail, and Belfast, Belfast Suburban Rail, with limited local services being offered in, or planned for, Cork, Limerick, and Galway.

The rail network in Ireland was developed by various private companies during the 19th century, with some receiving government funding. The network reached its greatest extent by 1920. A broad gauge of 1600mm (5 ft 3in) was agreed as the standard for the island, although there were also hundreds of kilometres of 914mm (3 ft) narrow gauge railways.

Many lines in the west were decommissioned in the 1930s under Éamon de Valera, with a further large cull in services by both CIÉ and the Ulster Transport Authority (UTA) during the 1960s, leaving few working lines in the northern third of the island. There is a campaign to bring some closed lines back into service, in particular the Limerick-Sligo line (the Western Railway Corridor), to facilitate economic regeneration in the west, which has lagged behind the rest of the country. There is also a move to restore service on the Dublin to Navan line, and smaller campaigns to re-establish the rail links between Sligo and Enniskillen/Omagh/Derry and Mullingar and Athlone/Galway. Under the Irish government's Transport 21 plan, the Cork to Midleton rail link was reopened in 2009. The re-opening of the Navan-Clonsilla rail link and the Western Rail Corridor are amongst future projects as part of the same plan.

Public transport services in Northern Ireland are sparse in comparison with those of the rest of Ireland or Great Britain. A large railway network was severely curtailed in the 1950s and 1960s. Current services includes suburban routes to Larne, Newry and Bangor, as well as services to Derry. There is also a branch from Coleraine to Portrush.

Since 1984 an electrified train service run by Iarnród Éireann has linked Dublin with its coastal suburbs. Running initially between Bray and Howth, the Dublin Area Rapid Transit (DART) system was extended from Bray to Greystones in 2000 and further extended from Howth Junction to Malahide. In 2004 a light rail system, Luas, was opened in Dublin serving the central and western suburbs, run by Veolia under franchise from the Railway Procurement Agency. The construction of the Luas system caused much disruption in Dublin. Plans to construct a Dublin Metro service including underground lines were mooted in 2001, but stalled in the financial crisis at the end of that decade.

Road transport

Roads and cars in Ireland
Total – 
South:  including  of motorway (2010)
North:  including  of motorway (2008)
paved – , unpaved – 

Ireland's roads link Dublin with all the major cities (Belfast, Cork, Limerick, Derry, Galway, and Waterford). Driving is on the left. Signposts in the Republic of Ireland are shown in kilometres and speed limits in kilometres per hour. Distance and speed limit signs in Northern Ireland use imperial units in common with the rest of the United Kingdom.

Historically, land owners developed most roads and later turnpike trusts collected tolls so that as early as 1800 Ireland had a  road network. In 2005 the Irish Government launched Transport 21, a plan envisaging the investment of €34 billion in transport infrastructure from 2006 until 2015. Several road projects were progressed but the economic crisis that began in 2008–09 has prevented its full implementation.

Between 2011 and 2015, diesel cars constituted 70% of new cars. In 2015, 27 new cars per 1,000 inhabitants were registered in Ireland, the same as the EU average.

Bus services
Ireland's first mail coach services were contracted with the government by John Anderson with William Bourne in 1791 who also paid to improve the condition of the roads. The system of mail coaches, carriages and "bians" was further developed by Charles Bianconi, based in Clonmel, from 1815 as a fore-runner of the modern Irish public transportation system.

State-owned Bus Éireann (Irish Bus) currently provides most bus services in the Republic of Ireland, outside Dublin, including an express coach network connecting most cities in Ireland, along with local bus services in the provincial cities. Bus Átha Cliath (Dublin Bus), a sister company of Bus Éireann, provides most of the bus services in Dublin, with some other operators providing a number of routes. These include Aircoach, a subsidiary of FirstGroup which provides services to Dublin Airport from Dublin city centre, South Dublin City, Greystones and Bray. They also operate two intercity express non-stop services service between Dublin Airport, Dublin City Centre, and Cork and also a non-stop route between Belfast City Centre, Dublin Airport and Dublin City. Other operators such as Irish Citylink and GoBus.ie compete on the Dublin-Galway route. Matthews Coaches run a direct service from Bettystown, Laytown and Julianstown to Dublin whilst Dublin Coach operate services to Portlaoise and Limerick. JJ Kavanagh and Sons also operates regular services on the Portlaoise/Limerick route as well as offering services to Waterford, Carlow, Kilkenny, Clonmel and a selection of regional towns and villages in the south.

Some private rural operators exist, such as Halpenny's in Blackrock, County Louth, which was the first private bus operator to run a public service in Ireland, Bus Feda (Feda O'Donnell Coaches), which operates twice daily routes from Ranafast, County Donegal to Galway and back.

In Northern Ireland Ulsterbus provides the bus network, with its sister company Metro providing services in Belfast. Both are part of state-owned Translink. Tiger Coaches operates a very late night bus service on Friday and Saturday nights between Belfast and Lisburn.

Private hire companies offer groups travelling throughout Ireland with options ranging from cars to 56 passenger coaches. Private Coach Hire Companies can be found at CTTC.ie.

Cross-border services (e.g. Dublin city centre to Belfast) are run primarily by a partnership of Ulsterbus and Bus Éireann with some services run across the border exclusively by one of the two companies (e.g. Derry–Sligo run by Bus Éireann). Aircoach, a private operator, does however operate a competing Dublin to Belfast Express service via Dublin Airport.

According to an Irish Times article in September 2022, 14.3% of national journeys in the Republic of Ireland were undertaken by bus, compared to the European average of 8.8%. However, this may be partly due to the lack of widespread train coverage in the country, as Ireland’s figure of 3.1% usage of trains for journeys is well behind the European average of 7.9%.

Modal share

Waterways

Total (2004) – 
 (pleasure craft only on inland waterways, several lengthy estuarine waterways)
 Grand Canal (Ireland)
 Royal Canal
 Shannon–Erne Waterway
 River Barrow
 River Shannon

Pipelines
Natural gas transmission network  (2003). There is a much more extensive distribution network.

Ports and harbours

Ireland has major ports in Dublin, Belfast, Cork, Rosslare, Derry and Waterford. Smaller ports exist in Arklow, Ballina, Drogheda, Dundalk, Dún Laoghaire, Foynes, Galway, Larne, Limerick, New Ross, Sligo, Warrenpoint and Wicklow.

Ports in the Republic of Ireland handled 2.8 million travellers crossing the sea between Ireland and Great Britain in 2014, a decrease of 1 million passengers movements since 2003. This has been steadily dropping for a number of years (20% since 1999), probably as a result of low cost airlines. Ferry connections between Britain and Ireland via the Irish Sea include the routes from Fishguard and Pembroke to Rosslare, and Cairnryan to Larne. The Stranraer to Belfast and Larne routes and the Swansea to Cork route have closed. There is also a connection between Liverpool and Belfast via the Isle of Man. The world's largest car ferry, Ulysses, is operated by Irish Ferries on the Dublin–Holyhead route.

In addition, there are ferries from Rosslare and Dublin to Cherbourg and Roscoff in France.

The vast majority of heavy goods trade is done by sea. Northern Irish ports handle 10 megatonnes (Mt) of goods trade with Britain annually, while ports in the south handle 7.6 Mt, representing 50% and 40% respectively of total trade by weight.

Mercantile Marine
Ships by type – bulk carrier 7, cargo ship 22, chemical tanker 1, container ship 3, roll-on/roll-off ship 1, short-sea passenger 1
Foreign-owned – Germany 3, Italy 7, Norway 2
Registered in other countries – 18 (2003 est.)

Aviation

Ireland has five main international airports: Dublin Airport, Belfast International Airport (Aldergrove), Cork Airport, Shannon Airport and Ireland West Airport (Knock). Dublin Airport is the busiest of these carrying almost 28 million passengers per year; a second terminal (T2) was opened in November 2010. All provide services to Great Britain and continental Europe, while Cork, Dublin and Shannon also offer transatlantic services. 
The London to Dublin air route is the ninth busiest international air route in the world, and also the busiest international air route in Europe, with 14,500 flights between the two in 2017. In 2015, 4.5 million people took the route, at that time, the world's second-busiest. Aer Lingus is the flag carrier of Ireland, although Ryanair is the country's largest airline. Ryanair is Europe's largest low-cost carrier, the second largest in terms of passenger numbers, and the world's largest in terms of international passenger numbers. For several decades until 2007 Shannon was a mandatory stopover for transatlantic routes to the United States. In recent years it has opened a pre-screening service allowing passengers to pass through US immigration services before departing from Ireland.

There are also several smaller regional airports: George Best Belfast City Airport, City of Derry Airport, Galway Airport, Kerry Airport (Farranfore), Sligo Airport (Strandhill), Waterford Airport and Donegal Airport (Carrickfinn). Scheduled services from these regional points are in the main limited to flights travelling to other parts of Ireland and to Great Britain. Airlines based in Ireland include Aer Lingus (the former national airline of the Republic of Ireland), Ryanair, Aer Arann and CityJet. Services to the Aran Islands are operated from Aerfort na Minna (Connemara Regional Airport).
	 
Ireland's national airline, Aer Lingus, provides services from Belfast City, Cork, Dublin and Shannon to Europe, North Africa and North America. Dublin and Cork airports are run by a State body, DAA (Dublin Airport Authority). Other Irish airlines are Ryanair, one of the largest in the world, CityJet, ASL Airlines Ireland and the Aer Lingus subsidiary Aer Lingus Regional. A number of other operators specialise in general aviation.

Airport passenger numbers 
For 2018 the passenger numbers were as follows:

Gateway Irish Urban Reference Destination Distances

See also

 Plug-in electric vehicles in the Republic of Ireland
 Public transport in Ireland
 State-sponsored bodies of Ireland
 List of Ireland-related topics

Footnotes

References

External links
 Rail Users Ireland – Ireland's National Rail User organisation
 Meath on Track – Navan railway campaign (defunct)
 A discussion on RTÉ Radio 1's science show Quantum Leap about the quality of GPS mapping in Ireland is available here. The discussion starts 8mins 17sec into the show. It was aired on 18 Jan 2007 Requires RealPlayer.